Belemnites may refer to:
Belemnitida, an extinct order of cephalopods commonly known as "belemnites"
Belemnites (genus), a belemnite genus from the Early Jurassic